LBW (Life Before Wedding) is a 2011 Indian Telugu-language film, directed by debutante Praveen Sattaru and starring newcomers Asif Taj, Rohan Gudlavalleti, Chinmayi Ghatrazu, Abhejit Pundla, Siddhu Jonnalagadda and Nishanti Evani.

Cast  
Asif Taj as Varun
 Rohan Gudlavalleti as Rajesh
 Chinmayi Ghatrazu as Radhika
Abhejit Pundla  as Jai
Siddhu Jonnalagadda as Rishi
 Nishanti Evani as Anu

Soundtrack
Music by Anil of Gamyam fame.

Release
Radhika Rajamani of Rediff.com gave the film a rating of two out of five stars and said that "the film strikes a perfect balance and makes for worthwhile viewing". A critic from 123Telugu wrote that "And Life Before Wedding (LBW) is a wonderful film which chronicles some such instances which decide our fate". Jeevi of Idlebrain.com gave rating of 3.25 out of 5 and opined that "LBW is honest and pure cinema aimed at multiplexes".

References

2010s Telugu-language films
2011 films
Films directed by Praveen Sattaru